Mystery Walk is a 1984 album by M + M (also known as Martha And The Muffins), produced by Daniel Lanois. The opening tracks, "Black Stations/White Stations" and "Cooling The Medium" were both released as singles, with the first track being the more successful of the two, achieving hit status in Canada and reaching #2 on the U.S. dance music chart.

A 30th anniversary CD and digital download edition of the album (remastered by Peter J. Moore) containing additional bonus tracks was released through the band's Muffin Music imprint in 2014.

Track listing 

 "Black Stations/White Stations"
 "Cooling the Medium"
 "Come Out and Dance"
 "I Start to Stop"
 "Big Trees"
 "In Between Sleep and Reason"
 "Garden in the Sky"
 "Nation of Followers"
 "Alibi Room"
 "Rhythm of Life"

Personnel 
 Martha Johnson - guitar, keyboards, vocals
 Mark Gane - guitar, keyboards, vocals
 Daniel Lanois - guitar, pedal steel, treatments
 Dave Piltch - bass
 Eluriel Tinker - bass
 Yogi Horton - drums
 Fred Maher - drums
 Martin Deller - percussion
 Dick Smith - percussion
 Randy Brecker, Michael Brecker, Wayne Smith - horns
 Rufus Cappdocia - cello
 Julie Masi, Brian Patti, Shawne Jackson, Sharon Lee Williams - background vocals

References

1984 albums
Martha and the Muffins albums
Albums produced by Daniel Lanois